Virginia Kimbrough Newell (born October 7, 1917) is an American mathematics educator, author, politician, and centenarian.

Early life and education
Virginia Kimbrough was born on October 7, 1917 in Advance, North Carolina, one of nine children. Although her family was African American, she grew up playing with the white children in a white neighborhood; her father, a builder, had the right to vote because he had a white ancestor, and both of her parents had studied at Shaw University, without finishing a degree. Kimbrough learned arithmetic helping her father in his measurements, and won a mathematics competition in elementary school.

Her family sent her away to live with a great aunt, so that she could obtain a better education at Atkins High School (North Carolina). There, she learned mathematics from teachers Togo West and Beatrice Armstead, earning straight A's and becoming a teacher's assistant. After graduating in 1936, she obtained scholarships from many colleges, and chose to major in mathematics at Talladega College, a historically black college in Alabama. Many of her teachers there had previously taught at Ivy League universities, and had come to Talladega to teach because of mandatory retirement at their former employers.

She later earned a master's degree from New York University, and took courses from the University of Wisconsin, Atlanta University, University of Chicago, and North Carolina State College. She completed a doctorate in education at the University of Sarasota in 1976, with the dissertation Development of mathematics self-instructional learning packages with activities from the newspaper for prospective elementary school teachers enrolled at Winston-Salem State University.

Mathematics
After college, Kimbrough returned to Atkins High School as a mathematics teacher. There, in 1943, she married George Newell, who had been her biology teacher at the same school, changing her name to Virginia Newell. They both taught at several institutions in Atlanta and Raleigh, North Carolina, including Washington Graded and High School, John W. Ligon High School, and Shaw University, where Virginia Newell was an associate professor of mathematics from 1960 to 1965.

In 1965, they both settled at Winston-Salem State University, where Virginia Newell became a mathematics professor. At Winston-Salem State University, she chaired the mathematics department, helped bring computers to the university and found the computer science program, becoming founding chair of the computer science department in 1979. She spearheaded several initiatives for middle school students, including the Math and Science Academy of Excellence, the New Directions for our Youth program aimed at preventing dropouts, and the Best Choice Center for after-school education. She was a co-founder and president of the North Carolina Council of Teachers on Mathematics

In 1980, Newell became one of the coauthors of Black Mathematicians and Their Works (with Joella Gipson, L. Waldo Rich, and Beauregard Stubblefield, Dorrance & Company), the first book to highlight the contributions of African American mathematicians. She was also editor of the newsletter of the National Association of Mathematicians, an organization for African American mathematicians, from 1974 into the 1980s.

She retired after 20 years of service at Winston-Salem State, circa 1985, as professor emerita.

Politics and later life
As part of the 1972 US presidential campaign, Newell was co-chair of the Shirley Chisholm campaign in North Carolina. In 1977, Newell was elected (with Vivian Burke) as one of the first two African American women to become aldermen of Winston-Salem, North Carolina; she represented its East Ward. She served in that position for 16 years.

Recognition
The computer science center at Winston-Salem State University is named for Newell, as is one of the streets in Winston-Salem, Virginia Newell Lane.

In 2017, Newell was given the Order of the Long Leaf Pine, the highest honor of the governor of North Carolina. In 2018, the National Association of Mathematicians gave her their Centenarian Award. In 2019, Newell was given the YWCA Women of Vision Lifetime Achievement Award. She was listed in 2021 as a Black History Month Honoree by the Mathematically Gifted and Black website.

References

1917 births
Living people
20th-century American mathematicians
21st-century American mathematicians
American women mathematicians
African-American mathematicians
Mathematics educators
Talladega College alumni
New York University alumni
Shaw University faculty
Winston-Salem State University faculty
Politicians from Winston-Salem, North Carolina
American centenarians
African-American centenarians
Women centenarians